CHBZ-FM (104.7 FM, Wild 104.7) is a radio station in Cranbrook, British Columbia. Owned by Pattison Media, it broadcasts a country format.

History 

The station originally began broadcasting in 1995 as CKKR until it was changed to the current callsign in 2000 as CHBZ. In 2004, CHBZ was given approval by the Canadian Radio-television and Telecommunications Commission (CRTC) to add a transmitter at 92.7 FM in Fernie.

In October 2022, the station rebranded from B104 to Wild 104.7, adapted from Calgary sister station CKWD-FM.

Rebroadcasters

References

External links
 Wild 104.7
 
 
 

Hbz
Hbz
Hbz
Radio stations established in 1995
1995 establishments in British Columbia